Končistá is a mountain in the Tatra Mountains, Slovakia.

References 

Mountains of Slovakia
Tatra Mountains
Mountains of the Western Carpathians
Two-thousanders of Slovakia
High Tatras